Avenidas (Portuguese for Avenues) is the eighth studio album by Rui Veloso, released in late 1998.  

The album was recorded at Livingston Recording Studios in London, England between 21 September and 9 October 1998.  All songs were written by Carlos Tê except for "Avenidas" and "Moby Dick", which were written by Clara Pinto Correia.

Track listing

References

External links
Avenidas at Rate Your Music
Avenidas at moo.pt 

1998 albums
Rui Veloso albums